Ron and Howard Albert, known as the Albert Brothers, are an American record production duo best known for their work on recordings at Criteria Studios in Miami, Florida, United States. Their work includes notable albums such as Layla and Other Assorted Love Songs by Derek and the Dominos and CSN, the 1977 Crosby, Stills, and Nash reunion album. Howard Albert has said "I think we have 40 gold records to our name and about 30 or so platinum." They have recently been inducted into the Florida Music Hall of Fame and have been working as music engineer/producers for over 40 years.

History
In 1967, with his brother Howard having been drafted to serve in the United States Army to fight in the Vietnam War, 14-year-old Ron Albert pursued a job at the only major recording studio in Miami at that time, Criteria Studios, where he was hire as a typist for the studio's tape library. A short time after Albert was hired, the studio's owner and chief engineer, Mack Emerman, became sick, and Ron Albert filled in as an engineer, eventually becoming Criteria Studios primary engineer upon Emerman's retirement. In 1969, Ron's brother Howard was discharged from the Army and, upon returning to Miami, began working alongside his brother at Criteria Studios as an engineer.

The Albert brothers became known as "Fat Albert Productions." Along with Atlantic producers Tom Dowd and Arif Mardin, Atlantic co-owner Jerry Wexler, and equipment-designer Jeep Harned, the brothers helped Criteria become a heavily sought-after recording studio. Eventually, the brothers became Criteria Studio business partners. By 1983, however, Criteria was in debt and, planning on retiring, the brothers sold their share in the company.  

In 1987, the Albert Brothers abandoned their retirement plans and partnered with another ex-Criteria engineer, Steve Alaimo, to form two new companies: Vision Records and Audio Vision Studios. Originally intended to house familiar artists from Criteria and TK Records, Vision Records' focus later shifted to releasing records by artists in the Miami Bass and Freestyle scenes.

The Albert Brothers currently reside in Miami, where they are primarily occupied with being the owners of the aforementioned Vision Records and Audio Vision Studios. With hip-hop being the most popular type of music in Miami, they now use digital Pro Tools for music production. Audio Vision Studios has been working with many major hip hop artists, including Lil Wayne. However, the brothers are not very involved in producing the records of the hip hop artists.

Music
Throughout their lengthy and expansive career, the Albert Brothers have engineered or produced music by many revered and distinguished artists. Artists whose music they have worked on include Jimmy Buffett, The Eagles, The Bee Gees, the Rolling Stones, Frank Zappa, Aretha Franklin, Crosby, Stills, and Nash, Derek and the Dominoes, the Allman Brothers Band, Jimi Hendrix, Buddy Miles, Joe Cocker, Procol Harum, Wishbone Ash, Johnny Winter, Betty Wright, John Mellencamp, Firefall and Pure Prairie League.

Drum sound
A key achievement the brothers are known for is their creation of the "Fat Albert" drum sound. They achieved this sound by adding a microphone to each part of a drum kit. A separate microphone would be added to each tom, snare, cymbal, bass drum, and so forth.  This resulted in a new and unique drum sound as no one before them had tried to multi-mike a drum kit. According to Ron, "as we got a few clients, we started getting recognition for it. The Rolling Stones and Eric Claptons and the Stephen Stillses of the world were coming for our drum sound.... It became the 'Miami Sound' because we were in Miami making it."

References

Record production duos
Record producers from Florida